The Ray Bradbury Nebula Award for Outstanding Dramatic Presentation (formerly the Ray Bradbury Award for Outstanding Dramatic Presentation) is given each year by the Science Fiction and Fantasy Writers of America (SFWA) for science fiction or fantasy dramatic works such as movies or television episodes. To be eligible for Nebula Award consideration a work must be published in English in the United States. Works published in English elsewhere in the world are also eligible provided they are released either on a website or in an electronic edition. Only individual works are eligible, not serials such as television series, though miniseries of three or fewer parts are allowed. The award, named to honor prolific author and screenwriter Ray Bradbury, was begun in 1992 as the Ray Bradbury Award for Outstanding Dramatic Presentation. It was not considered a Nebula Award, despite being awarded at the same ceremony, and was chosen by the President of SFWA instead of by a vote. This form of the award was given in 1992, 1999, 2001, and 2009. In 2010, the Nebula Award for Best Script, which was awarded for scripts from 1974 to 1978 and from 2000 to 2009, was discontinued. The Ray Bradbury Award, though still not considered an official Nebula category, was converted to follow the normal nomination and voting procedures of the Nebula Awards in its place. In 2019 SFWA announced that the award was considered a Nebula category, and the following year the award was retitled the Ray Bradbury Nebula Award for Outstanding Dramatic Presentation.

Nebula Award nominees and winners are chosen by members of SFWA, though the creators of the nominees do not need to be members. Works are nominated each year by members in a period around December 15 through January 31, and the six works that receive the most nominations then form the final ballot, with additional nominees possible in the case of ties. Soon after, members are given a month to vote on the ballot, and the final results are presented at the Nebula Awards ceremony in May. Members are not permitted to nominate their own works, and ties in the final vote are broken, if possible, by the number of nominations the works received. Prior to the 2009 awards, the eligibility period for nominations was defined as one year after the publication date of the work, which allowed the possibility for works to be nominated in the calendar year after their publication and then be awarded in the calendar year after that.

During the 14 nomination years, 84 works have been nominated, with 13 winners in addition to the 4 awards chosen without nominees in 1992–2009. A few franchises have seen multiple nominations; the Marvel Cinematic Universe has earned the most nominations with nine films, two television seasons, and one television episode, with one film and one television season winning. Other franchises with multiple nominations are Doctor Who with one win out of three nominated television episodes, Star Wars with three film and three television episode nominations, and The Good Place with one win out of three nominated television episodes. The award is typically for television episodes and films, but occasionally rewards works in other formats: the 1999 award was given to an entire television series and three other seasons have been nominated since, the 2001 award was given to a radio anthology series, the 2009 award was given to a creator's entire filmography to date, and one of the 2019 nominations was a music album.

Winners and nominees 

In the following table, the years correspond to the date of the ceremony, rather than when the work was first published. Entries with a blue background and an asterisk (*) next to the work's name have won the award; those with a white background are the other nominees on the shortlist. The creators listed are the people and roles identified by SFWA, and may not match the full credited people or titles for the work; SFWA states in its rules that the award is given to the "principal" director and writers.

  *   Winners and joint winners

References

External links
 Nebula Awards official site
 Ray Bradbury Nebula Award for Outstanding Dramatic Presentation

American speculative fiction awards
Awards established in 1992
Nebula Awards
Ray Bradbury
Science fiction awards